Orcininae is a contested subfamily of oceanic dolphins composed of 1 living and 3 extinct genera. It may be superseded by Delphinidae. Its only extant member is the orca (Orcinus orca); all other extant genera formerly classified in it have been moved out.

Orcininae is thought to be one of the most basal members of Delphinidae, with only the Atlantic white-sided dolphin (Lagenorhynchus acutus) being more basal.

Classification

Arimidelphis †
Arimidelphis sorbinii †
Hemisyntrachelus †
Hemisyntrachelus cortesii 
Hemisyntrachelus pisanus
Orcinus
Orcinus citoniensis †
Orcinus meyeri †
Orcinus orca
Orcinus paleorca †
Platalearostrum †
Platalearostrum hoekmani †

References 

Mammal subfamilies
Oceanic dolphins